Danila Alekseyevich Polyakov (born 9 June 1993) is a Russian former football player.

Club career
He made his debut in the Russian Football National League for FC Veles Moscow on 1 August 2020 in a game against FC Tekstilshchik Ivanovo, he substituted Ruslan Fishchenko in the 59th minute.

References

External links
 
 Profile by Russian Football National League

1993 births
Footballers from Moscow
Living people
Russian footballers
Association football midfielders
FC Lokomotiv Moscow players
FC Veles Moscow players
FC Strogino Moscow players
FC Volga Ulyanovsk players
FC Saturn Ramenskoye players
Russian First League players
Russian Second League players